Jyväskylä University Library is a multidisciplinary university library in Finland. It is an independent institute of the University of Jyväskylä and one of the oldest libraries in Finland.

Key information 

Jyväskylä University Library is a Depository Library for Finnish publications, and a European Documentation Centre for EU resources (EDC Library). It includes the Main Library and two Campus Libraries.
Over a half million customers visit the library annually.

References

External links 
 Jyväskylä University Library Website

Libraries in Finland
Buildings and structures in Jyväskylä